Madeleine A Scarborough (born 1964), is a female former swimmer who competed for Great Britain and England.

Swimming career
Scarborough won four National championships, she won the 1989 and 1990 ASA National Championship in the 100 metres butterfly and the 200 metres butterfly.

She represented England and won a silver medal in the 4 x 100 metres medley relay and a bronze medal in the 100 metres butterfly event, at the 1990 Commonwealth Games in Auckland, New Zealand. She also represented Great Britain in the 1989 European Aquatics Championships.

References

1964 births
English female swimmers
Swimmers at the 1990 Commonwealth Games
Commonwealth Games medallists in swimming
Commonwealth Games silver medallists for England
Commonwealth Games bronze medallists for England
Living people
Medallists at the 1990 Commonwealth Games